Suicide, also known as wall ball, is a game typically played by children and teenagers. The rules vary widely from place to place; those given below are not necessarily a "standard" form of the rules.

Setup
Suicide requires at least two players, and can have as many as can be accommodated by the playing area.  The playing area comprises a hard surface, such as concrete, and a large, flat wall, and is usually outdoors. The game also requires a rubber ball or a tennis ball.

Suicide may be played in teams, but is most commonly played individually.

Gameplay

The object of the game is to be the last remaining player.  To stay in the game, players have to avoid being "pegged" out.

When the game begins, a player throws the ball against the wall.  If the ball bounces off the wall and then hits the ground, other players are free to grab the ball and re-throw it.  If the ball is caught by another player before it hits the ground, the player who threw the ball must run and touch the wall.  Until the player touches the wall, they are "open" to be "pegged" (i.e., struck hard with a thrown ball) by the player who caught it. If a player comes into contact with the ball but fails to catch it, they are also "open" to be "pegged".

Note: for games featuring more sensitive players, it may be acceptable, instead of pegging a player who is open to get them out, to throw the ball at the wall before the player "tags up" (touches the wall). The no-pegging rule must be stated before the game begins.  If someone is pegged with the ball when the no-pegging rule is in effect, then it would be the same as if the player had simply missed the wall on the return and they must touch the wall.

Frankford rules

In the lower northeast of Philadelphia "Sui" as it was called had a variation on the standard rules.

Typically played with a tennis ball or racquetball for "higher stakes"
it was preferred to play against a stone wall with better angles and texture to randomize the direction of the ball on the impact.
Also using the cement steps up to the row home was acceptable as well.

Once the ball was thrown there were several options

 If the ball was caught without bouncing with 2 hands by any player, the pitcher had to run up to the wall before getting pegged, either yelling "sui" or "safe".

 If the ball touched a player and they didn't catch it or bounced off them, they would have to run to the wall and again call "safe or sui" For fear of being pegged.

 If the ball popped into the air and was caught single-handed, all players had to run to the wall and call safe/sui, for fear of being pegged. The 2-hand catch rule also applied to a popup ball.

After being pegged 3 times you had to go for the firing squad: All players had one shot to peg the person out from a predetermined point, typically 30 feet away. (sidewalk + 2 car widths)

You were allowed to tuck your head into your chest and keep your arms in front of you. So the only way to get pegged was on your back, buttocks, or legs.

Torah Vodaas rules

In this variant, there is no pegging other players and all throws are modified pegs thrown toward the wall.  Furthermore, when someone's ball is caught off the wall, that person receives an out automatically without the need for a modified peg.

Penalties
Roughhousing is acceptable in most games, including setting picks and tripping up players attempting to go for the ball or go for the wall.  It is not permissible, however, to physically interfere with a player who is throwing the ball, nor is it permissible to stand against the wall and prevent other players from touching it when they need to.  Doing either of those constitutes a penalty. Fighting and overly rough play may also draw a penalty.

The "no-pegging" rule may be waived for penalties, but if it is not, then a player who receives a penalty gets an automatic out.

Another penalty is enforced for the practice known as "wall-hugging."  Wall-hugging, in its purest form, occurs when a player positions themselves so that they are in constant contact with the wall.  Therefore, in theory, if the ball hits them, they automatically become "safe", since they are already in contact with the wall.  This is considered unfair and is dealt with accordingly.

A player who wall-hugs, which is officially called when a player stands against the wall at the moment the ball contacts it (unless they are touching the wall to save themselves), is considered open.  In order to be safe, the offending player is required to run to the other side of the court (either an opposite wall or an arbitrary marker set up beforehand) and then run back and touch the wall.

Wall-hugging can be modified to some arbitrary point before the wall (usually several steps away). In this case, even without touching the wall, players can be penalized as if they were wall-hugging.

An "out" based system is applied in many games, where three outs causes a player to leave the game and, in some cases, endure a "punishment" as described below. Another commonly used substitute for "outs" is the usage of a predetermined number of "lives", which can be lost the same way as in the "outs" system, or in some variants even be gained.

In some games that allow pegging, a player who is pegged for three outs (or loses all "lives") is forced to stand facing the wall with their hands on the wall, in a position similar to a police 'pat-down' stance (often referred to as "Bottoms Up"). The player who pegged them last is then allowed to peg them from any distance as hard as possible either one or three times depending on the severity of the rules. Variations of this rule are that three players are mutually selected to peg the victim once each, that the punishing player can choose to "give" one or more of their three pegs to other players, or that all players are allowed one peg each at the victim, which can include 10 or more players in a larger game. The punishing players often aim for the head or buttocks of the victim. Headhunting may be allowed in this punishment ritual even when it is not allowed in normal play.

Strategies
Suicide games are usually won by those who have expert dexterity and the ability to run and throw the ball fast.  There are a number of offensive and defensive strategies that players can employ.

 Some players deliberately avoid the ball at all costs.  While this is looked down upon, it is a legal strategy.  The goal for these players is to simply stay out of trouble.  The problem usually arises when others notice their behavior (made blatant by allowing ball to roll through their legs without any attempt to stop it) and begin to target them specifically.  The best way to avoid the ball is to stand as far back from the wall as possible, behind all the other players if possible.  Not only is this technically the safest place to be but it also allows them to be the furthest player back, who may peg anyone they wish to if the ball trickles back far enough.
 Cunning players may rely on "striking," which is deliberately pegging another player with the ball even when they aren't open.  Although the player who strikes is putting themselves in the open, the goal is to catch another player unawares and, in the confusion, touch the wall before the victim can.  The victim hopefully will be the target of whoever catches the ball.
 Some players choose to stand as close as possible to the wall without actually being penalized for wall-hugging. The goal for them is to try to grab the ball whenever convenient and quickly send it back into play.  If they are open, they rely on their close proximity to the wall to become safe immediately.  A method which is usually employed by these players is to "sky" the ball, meaning they throw the ball very hard against the wall in an upward direction so that it will balloon in the air over the other players.  Though this makes it easier for other players to catch the ball, it allows adequate time for the thrower to race to the wall to become safe; usually they reach the wall before the ball is even caught.  The downside to this strategy is that it is less effective if the no-pegging rule is in effect.  Also, these players may have a greater tendency to double-touch or be "struck" by strikers.

In general, players should avoid throwing the ball so that it comes off the wall either as a roller or a line drive.  The harder the ball is to catch, the better the throw.  Balls that fly high in the air are dangerous for they may be caught on the fly.

Calling Out
There are various elaborations on the base game concept which involve the use of "calling out" phrases in specific situations to enact special rules.

If the game is played with a fence behind the court used and a "lives" system is being utilized, "watermelon" rules may be applied.  If the ball seems as if it is about to go over the fence, any player can call out "watermelon".  If the ball goes over the fence, those players gain a "life".  If it doesn't, they lose one.  "Watermelon" must be called out before the ball is within a short distance of the fence.

There is also a "freeze" rule used in some occasions (in some places it's renamed "challenge", or "reach"), wherein whenever a player catches the ball from a long distance away from the wall, any other player may call out "freeze", meaning the person who has caught the ball must stop where they stand and throw the ball. When reaching the wall is impossible for the player, some games allow for the player to call "relay" and pass the ball to a player within reach of the wall. An American variation of this rule allows the "frozen" player 2 options: throw the ball and risk a life on if it hits the wall, or drop it directly onto the ground below them and run for the wall.

References

See also

American handball
Dodge ball
Tag (game)
Wall ball
Suicide (the act of killing oneself)

Children's games
Wall and ball games